Nick Adams (born Jamile Adams in 1973) is an American television writer and author. He served as a writer for the Netflix original series, BoJack Horseman.

Adams, a Black person, is the author of the book Making Friends with Black People, which he describes as a humorous but potent "how to guide" to bridging racial divides. Adams lives in Los Angeles, California with his wife.  He is also a member of the Los Angeles chapter of the Democratic Socialists of America.

Making Friends with Black People
In an interview with National Public Radio interviewer Ed Gordon, Adams says "boredom" was the impetus that drove him to write Making Friends with Black People. He was living in Tucson, Arizona at the time, a place without a substantial Black community. Adams notes that the comedic tone of his book allows people to be more "open" to some of the things he has to say, which might have otherwise come across as offensive.

In the book, Adams discusses many themes pertinent to the Black community, including his preference for the term "Black" over "African American". "It makes more sense than the others in every way", says Adams. "Phonetically, it's no contest.  One syllable versus multi-syllabic hyphenates.  Black wins hands down.  Although initially it doesn't conjure the lofty bourgeois imagery of the other terms, it depicts a more realistic portrayal of who we really are."

TV series
"NBC is developing a comedy based on the book "Making Friends With Black People," a buddy comedy that will focus on the state of race relations in the U.S. "From time to time, race bubbles up in the consciousness of the country and then dissipates," said Nick Adams. "Now, with Barack Obama as the President-Elect, people are talking about race a lot more. We hope to capitalize on that and not let the dialogue die down. ... It seemed like a good opportunity to strike while the iron is hot." "The Game" Executive Producers Mara Brock Akil (who also created "Girlfriends") and Salim Akil will write the script and serve as exec producers on the project. The series will center on two guys—one African-American and one white—who become close friends, but who don't necessarily see things the same way. Universal Media Studios is behind the project, along with Industry Entertainment. Adams will serve as a co-producer on the project, while Industry's Dianne Fraser and Eryn Brown will be co-exec producers.

New Girl
Adams is currently a Story Editor for the Fox series New Girl. He is the credited co-writer of "Fancyman" from Season 1, and the credited writer of "Pepperwood" from Season 2.

References

External links
Nick Adams' official website

1973 births
Living people
American male comedians
American humorists
Place of birth missing (living people)
African-American non-fiction writers
American non-fiction writers
Members of the Democratic Socialists of America
21st-century American comedians
21st-century African-American people
20th-century African-American people